Richard Turnbull (1826 – 17 July 1890) was a 19th-century member of parliament in Canterbury, New Zealand.

References

1826 births
1890 deaths
Members of the New Zealand House of Representatives
New Zealand MPs for South Island electorates
19th-century New Zealand politicians